Falsetto (1876–1904) was an American Thoroughbred Champion  racehorse and outstanding sire. Bred and raced by J. W. Hunt Reynolds of Lexington, Kentucky, his dam was Farfaletta and his sire was General Abe Buford's very good runner, Enquirer.

Conditioned for racing by African American trainer, Eli Jordan, as a three-year-old in 1879 Falsetto won four of his five starts and was the dominant horse of his age group in the United States.  Under African American star jockey, Isaac Murphy, he ran second to Lord Murphy in the Kentucky Derby  but won the Phoenix Hotel Stakes and the Clark Handicap, plus he defeated the great Spendthrift in winning the Kenner and Travers Stakes.

Owner J. W. Hunt Reynolds died in September 1880 and the horse was sent to Pierre Lorillard IV who raced him in England along with several other American horses including  Horse and Iroquois. 

Returned to the United States and retired to stud duty, Falsetto stood at A. J. Alexander's Woodburn Stud in Woodford County, Kentucky. Falsetto became one of only four stallions to sire three Kentucky Derby winners and another of his sons, Sir Cleges, ran second in the 1908 Derby. Among his progeny, Falsetto was the sire of:
 Dew Drop/Dewdrop (b. 1883) - American Champion Three-Year-Old Filly, won Champagne Stakes, Monmouth Oaks
 Chant (b. 1891) - won 1894 Kentucky Derby
 His Eminence - won 1901 Kentucky Derby, Clark Handicap
 Sir Huon - won Kentucky Derby, Latonia Derby

Falsetto died of pneumonia in August 1904 at age twenty-eight.

References
 Falsetto's pedigree and partial racing stats
 July 20, 1879 New York Times article on Falsetto's win in the Travers Stakes
 August 13, 1879 New York Times article on Falsetto's win in the Kenner Stakes

1876 racehorse births
1904 racehorse deaths
Thoroughbred family 4-r
Racehorses bred in Kentucky
Racehorses trained in the United States
American Champion racehorses